Linaria purpurea or purple toadflax is a purple-flowered plant native to Italy, part of the plantain family (Plantaginaceae). It is sometimes planted in gardens and is also an introduced weed in North America and other parts of Europe.

Description

It is a perennial herbaceous plant growing 30 to 70 centimeters tall with linear leaves 2 to 5 centimeters in length. The inflorescence is a raceme of flowers occupying the top of the stem. The flower is between 1 and 2 centimeters long with five lobes arranged into two lips with a spur at the end. The flower is usually light to medium purple in color. The fruit is a capsule.

There is a pale pink cultivar of the species named 'Canon Went'.

Range
It is native to Italy, but it can be found growing wild as an introduced species in parts of western North America, including California, western Washington, and British Columbia, and it is cultivated as an ornamental plant. It occurs naturally in moist, moderately nutrient-rich places.
In the UK it is regarded as something of a weed, spreading readily on stony waste ground and walls, although it is tolerated for its attractive, long-lasting flowers which are very attractive to bees.

Toxicity and chemistry
This plant is poisonous to livestock, though ruminants may tend to avoid consuming it. The larvae of some species of Lepidoptera (butterflies) use this plant as a food source.
In a recent study conducted in Italy the plant was found to contain a compound exhibiting antifungal activity, which drastically reduced the production of aflatoxin B1 in Aspergillus flavus Link., making it a potential natural and 'green' anti-aflatoxin B1 agent suitable for use in the food industry.

References

External links 

purpurea
Flora of Italy
Taxa named by Philip Miller